Shahsawar Khan (born 6 January 1993) better known Shahsawar  is a Pakistani popular Pashto musician and singer born in Swabi then shifted with family to Karachi, Pakistan. He started interest in singing at the age of 13 and after 4 years of learning he started his career in music. He got his inspiration from Raheem Shah.

Sexual assault charges
On 12 April 2017 Shahsawar Khan got arrested by KPK Police over alleged rape with a girl from Mardan and sent him to jail on judicial remand for 14 days. While the court also sent the woman to the Darul Aman and directed the police to conduct medical report of the prosecutor.

References
 

Living people
1993 births
Pakistani male singers
Pashto-language singers
Pashtun people
People from Peshawar
Rape in Pakistan